Brent Howard is an American attorney and politician serving as a member of the Oklahoma Senate from the 38th district. Elected in November 2018, he assumed office on January 14, 2019.

Early life and education 
Howard was born in Southwestern Oklahoma and raised in the town of Altus. He earned a Bachelor of Science degree from Oklahoma State University–Stillwater, a Juris Doctor from the University of Oklahoma College of Law, and a Master of Laws from the New York University School of Law.

Career 
After graduating from law school, Howard established a private legal practice, where he specializes in estate and tax law. He was elected to the Oklahoma Senate in November 2018 and assumed office on January 14, 2019. Howard also serves as vice chair of the Senate Finance Committee.

References 

Living people
People from Altus, Oklahoma
Oklahoma State University alumni
University of Oklahoma College of Law alumni
New York University School of Law alumni
Oklahoma lawyers
Republican Party Oklahoma state senators
Year of birth missing (living people)